Tsulikana (Dargwa: ЦIуликъана) is a rural locality (a selo) in Shuktynsky Selsoviet, Akushinsky District, Republic of Dagestan, Russia. The population was 261 as of 2010. There are 3 streets.

Geography
Tsulikana is located 18 km west of Akusha (the district's administrative centre) by road. Dubrimakhi is the nearest rural locality.

References 

Rural localities in Akushinsky District